Prabhakar is an Indian given name and surname. 
Prabhakars are Indian Brahmins mostly limited to North Indian states like Jammu and Kashmir, Punjab, Haryana and Rajasthan. They belong to sage Vatsa.
People with the name include:
 Prabhakar, an Indian Telugu actor known for his role as Inkoshi, the king of the Kalakeyas in the film Baahubali: The Beginning.
 Manoj Prabhakar, a former Indian cricketer
 Ponnam Prabhakar, an Indian politician and a member of 15th Lok Sabha
 Sundarwati Nawal Prabhakar (1922–2010), an Indian National Congress politician
 Prabhakar Reddy, an Indian Telugu film actor of Andhra Pradesh
 Prabhakar Panshikar, a stage actor in Maharashtra
 Tiger Prabhakar, an Indian Kannada actor
 Vishnu Prabhakar, an Indian Hindi writer
 Prabhakar Raghavan, Senior Vice President at Google, 
 Arati Prabhakar, the former head of DARPA

It can also refer to:
 Prabhākara (c. 7th century), Indian philosopher grammarian in the Mimamsa tradition
 Janardhan Sharma, known as Prabhakar in Nepal

See also

 

Indian given names
Surnames